Ludwig Bielenberg (1 June 1930 – 26 July 2000) was a German sailor. He competed at the 1952 Summer Olympics and the 1956 Summer Olympics.

References

External links
 
 

1930 births
2000 deaths
German male sailors (sport)
Olympic sailors of Germany
Olympic sailors of the United Team of Germany
Sailors at the 1952 Summer Olympics – 5.5 Metre
Sailors at the 1956 Summer Olympics – 5.5 Metre
Sportspeople from Kiel